Caroline Zoe Schumm (Zoe) (born May 27, 1988) is an American fashion designer and entrepreneur. Her maiden name is Caroline Zoe Waggoner.

Zoe grew up in Hutchinson, Kansas. She attended Kansas State University from 2006 to 2011 with a dual major in Apparel & Textile design and Apparel Marketing and a minor in business. While at Kansas State, Zoe was awarded Outstanding Senior in her field, won a national design competition, and also won various regional design competitions. In college, Zoe studied the effects that mainstream fashion manufacturing had in countries where it was produced, including the prevalence of child labor, very low wages, inhumane working conditions, and environmental pollution.

Design career 
In 2012, Schumm and her husband created 4 All Humanity, a fair trade apparel company.

Awards 

2013, 4 All Humanity won the national Eco-excellence in Fashion Award, from Natural Child World.
2014, Zoe won Emerging Entrepreneur of the Year, from the Kansas Small Business Development Center.
2019, Zoe won the Distinguished Service Award from the College of Health and Human Sciences at Kansas State University.

References

1988 births
Living people
American fashion designers
American women fashion designers
Kansas State University alumni
21st-century American women